KFBC (1240 AM) is an American sports formatted radio station based in Cheyenne, Wyoming and targets the entire market. The station is a full time affiliate of CBS Sports Radio as well as the flagship station of the Cowboy State News Network. Additionally, KFBC is a part-time affiliate of the Denver Broncos and Colorado Rockies radio networks (both through KOA) as well as the Wyoming Cowboys.

Signal
KFBC puts out a continuous 700 watts of non-directional power which provides local coverage to Cheyenne and the surrounding area, while it can be marginally heard in Western Nebraska, Northern Colorado (even Fort Collins), and some of South-east Wyoming. KFBC is unusual in the fact that Class C stations are normally 1,000 watts, such as KRAL. The station is on one of six shared-local frequencies (the others are 1230, 1340, 1400, 1450, and 1490), informally referred to as the "graveyard" frequencies, because of the excessive number of stations. Because of this, the skywave (night-time) signal mixes with several others, thus limiting its usefulness to its groundwave signal. However, a skilled operator with a very directional antenna may separate it from the rest, upwards of 300 miles.

To provide another option, as well as to take advantage of AM Revitalization, KFBC signed on translator K248CZ, (97.5 FM) located Downtown at 250 watts, just a few miles away from the KFBC tower. This signal provides a local grade signal to the city itself, and depending on the conditions, can extend to the Nebraska Panhandle, much like its parent station. This is more likely to happen at night or when there is more humidity in the air. In general, the translator copies everything from the KFBC broadcast; it even broadcasts in mono, a rarity for modern-day FM translators, although still the standard for some AM stations.

History
KFBC is the oldest surviving radio station in Cheyenne. It was founded in December 1940 by Tracy McCracken, publisher of the Wyoming State Tribune and Wyoming Eagle (since merged as the Wyoming Tribune Eagle).
however records indicate they were around since at least 1941, It was originally located on 1450. 

Soon after signing on, KFBC forced Cheyenne's original radio station, KYAN on 1400, off the air. In 1941 (or 1942, depending on the source), KYAN's owners sold their facilities to KFBC. 

KFBC originally was an independent station before becoming an affiliate of NBC Blue, before going independent again. From the very start, KFBC was very sports orientated, being the first to hire Curt Gowdy as a broadcaster. The McCracken family started KFBC-TV (now KGWN-TV) in 1954, effectively making the two sister outlets, along with the Wyoming Tribune Eagle.

In the 21st century, KFBC took on a news/talk format omnipresent of post-golden era stations, while including some sports, like the Motor Racing Network. A massive shake-up of Cheyenne AM affiliations occurred between 2006 and 2016; fellow station KRAE went from classic country to ESPN to oldies. Upon KRAE's switch from sports to oldies, KFBC took up the position as Cheyenne's sports station, which the station management regarded well. Meanwhile, KGAB picked up KFBC's news and talk status.  Both KFBC and former sister station '92.9 The Boss' launched Christmas Cash in the 2010s, a give-away contest that continues to exist as of the 2020 Holiday season. In the 2020s, KFBC continues to serve as Cheyenne's CBS Sports Radio station and will occasionally air local games and events. Recently, the station will play music during fireworks, mainly for 4th of July, and now for New Year's Day fireworks.

Programming
KFBC is mostly a pass-through for CBS Sports Radio, but occasionally airs local programming. It produces two local shows each weekday. During the weekend, it is a full simulcast of the CBS Sports Radio national feed, aside from live sports coverage.

References

External links
KFBC Radio

Cowboy State News Network

FBC
Radio stations established in 1940
Sports radio stations in the United States